Bebê a Bordo (Baby on Board in English) is a Brazilian telenovela produced and broadcast on TV Globo at a timeslot of 7:00pm, from June 13, 1988 to February 11, 1989, consisting of 209 episodes.

Plot 
Ana (Isabela Garcia) ends up repeating the actions of her mother, who abandoned her at birth. But fate is lending a helping hand as Ana unknowingly drops off her baby girl, Helena (Beatriz Bertu/Adriana Valbon), at the house of Laura (Dina Sfat), her mother. Meanwhile, Tonico Ladeira (Tony Ramos), Zezinho (Léo Jaime), Antonio Antonucci (Rodolfo Bottino), and the brothers Tonhão (José de Abreu), Rei (Guilherme Fontes) and Rico (Guilherme Leme), are disputing the paternity of the girl, as Ana does not know who Helena's father might be. There also is Ângela (Maria Zilda Bethlem), an efficient but repressed secretary working for Tonico who is dedicated to care for her siblings Caco (Tarcísio Filho) and Zetó (Jorge Fernando). She falls for the radio announcer, Tonhão, who she realizes is the ominous man destined to be the love of her life from her dreams.

Cast 
 Isabela Garcia as Ana Bezerra / Sílvia Siqueira Ramos
 Tony Ramos as Antônio Ladeira (Tonico)
 Dina Sfat as Laura Petraglia
 Maria Zilda Bethlem as Ângela Maria
 Ary Fontoura as Nero Petraglia
 Armando Bógus as Alcides Lima Coutinho (Liminha)
 José de Abreu as Antônio Barbirotto (Tonhão)
 Inês Galvão as Sônia (Soninha)
 Léo Jaime as José (Zezinho)
 Nicette Bruno as Branca Ladeira
 Sebastião Vasconcelos as Tarcísio Barbirotto (Tico)
 Débora Duarte as Joana Mendonça
 Patrícya Travassos as Ester Ladeira Amado
 Rodolfo Bottino as Antonio Antonucci
 Guilherme Fontes as Reinaldo Luís Barbirotto (Rei)
 Guilherme Leme as Ricardo Antônio Barbirotto (Rico)
 Sílvia Buarque as Raio-de-luar
 Françoise Forton as Glória Ladeira
 Carla Marins as Maria Luísa (Sininho)
 Márcia Real as Walkíria
 Paulo Figueiredo as Eduardo Augusto Rêgo Grande (Dinho)
 Sílvia Bandeira as Lourdes (Dinha)
 Tarcísio Filho as Carlos Antônio (Caco)
 Paulo Guarnieri as Nicolau Petraglia
 Felipe Pinheiro as Ladslau Petraglia
 Deborah Evelyn as Fânia Favale
 Ilva Niño as Mainha
 João Signorelli as Celso Bezerra
 Irving São Paulo as Bad Cat
 Cristina Sano as Grega
 Jorge Fernando as José Antônio (Zetó)
 Leina Krespi as Vespúcia (Vespa)
 Fábio Pillar as Gilberto Amado (Amado)
 Anderson Müller as Bad Boy
 Sônia Mamede as Ilka
 Duda Mamberti as Téo
 Chiquinho Brandão as Joca
 Edson Silva as Severo
 Carla Tausz as Elza
 Beatriz Bertu and Adriana Valbon as Heleninha (the baby)
 João Rebello as Juninho Ladeira
 Catarina Dahl as Flavinha
 Lilian Leal as Luciana

Cameo 
 Tereza Rachel as Luciana Mendonça
 Cláudia Magno as Gilda
 Bel Kutner as Laura (young)
 Vera Holtz as Madalena
 Evandro Mesquita as Raúl e Pancho (cicerones)
 Bebel Gilberto as Marisol 
 Paolette as Osvaldão 
 Carlos Eduardo Dolabella as Augusto
 Tonico Pereira as Válter
 Emiliano Queiroz as Brito
 Mauro Mendonça as Senator Favalle
 Cininha de Paula as woman of Senator Favalle
 Joyce de Oliveira as Sra. Perácia Prado Almeida
 Pedro Cardoso as Flávio
 Rosita Thomaz Lopes as Dona Maria Clara
 Alexandre Zacchia
 Nica Bonfim
 Bemvindo Sequeira
 Lucy Mafra
 Cláudia Mauro as Dona Brígida 
 Paulo César Grande
 Marcos Wainberg as Leonel
 Carlos Takeshi as Xangai

References

External links

1988 Brazilian television series debuts
1989 Brazilian television series endings
1988 telenovelas
TV Globo telenovelas
Brazilian telenovelas
Portuguese-language telenovelas